was a Japanese daimyō of the late Edo period, who ruled the Tatsuno Domain.

|-

References 

1809 births
1874 deaths
Rōjū
Daimyo
Kyoto Shoshidai